Sanchai and Sonchat Ratiwatana were the defending champions but lost in the quarterfinals to Ben McLachlan and Go Soeda.

Saketh Myneni and Vijay Sundar Prashanth won the title after defeating McLachlan and Soeda 7–6(7–3), 7–6(7–5) in the final.

Seeds

Draw

References
 Main Draw

Vietnam Open - Doubles
2017 Doubles